Attention to Detail Ltd (ATD) was a British video game developer based in Hatton. Founded by University of Birmingham graduates in September 1988, it was acquired by Kaboom Studios in January 1997. The studio shut down in August 2003 due to financial issues at Kaboom Studios. The studio is known for developing the Rollcage series.

History 
In mid-1987, Chris Gibbs, Martin Green, Nalin Sharma, and Jon Steele created the Atari ST port of Super Sprint for Activision. Sharma had already had experience developing Commodore 64 and contacts in the video game industry, which enabled the group's partnership with Activision. The conversion was finished in twelve weeks. Simultaneously, Fred Gill had developed the game Octan for the ZX Spectrum, which he sold to Firebird. Gibbs, Gill, Green, and Stelle, as well as Jim Torjussen, founded Attention to Detail in September 1988. All founders were University of Birmingham graduates. The company occupied  of converted barns in Hatton, in rural Warwickshire. In January 1997, the company was acquired by Geoff Brown, who established Geoff Brown Holdings (later Kaboom Studios) to manage the ownership. Amid financial struggles at Kaboom Studios and with Attention to Detail unable to find a publisher for Ion Runner, the studio was placed into liquidation on 28 August 2003, laying off all 50 staff members and cancelling Ion Runner.

Games developed

References 

1988 establishments in England
2003 disestablishments in England
Companies based in Warwickshire
Defunct video game companies of the United Kingdom
Video game companies disestablished in 2003
Video game companies established in 1988